is a manga artist, born on March 3, 1973, best known for being the author of the manga Chibi Vampire. Her work has been published under four different names:  (professionally published non-pornographic comics, except for Sakura no Ichiban),  (same characters but different readings; only in Taishō Komachi Jikenchō Sakura no Ichiban!),  (spelled with different kanji) when drawing CG's for PC games, and  when drawing hentai manga or HCG's for PC games.
In middle school she was a member of the brass band.

List of manga work

as Yuna Kagesaki
  (1 volume)
  (1 volume)
  (11 volumes, plus a spinoff volume)
  (illustrator) (1 volume)
  (1 volume)
 {{nihongo|Karin|かりん|}} (15 volumes, including an extra unnumbered volume)
  (art only; written by ) (serialized in Good! Afternoon; 4 tankōbon volumes)
  (5 volumes)
  (1 volume)
  (serialized in Dragon Age, started August 2013 and ended after 15 chapters)
  (serialized in Comic High!, starting 2014) (ended with 9 chapters, 2 volumes)

as Yuna Kagezaki
  (5 volumes)

as Yūna Kagesaki
  (1 volume)
  (1 volume)
  (1 volume)
  (1 volume)

as Yuta Kageyama
  (1 volume)

List of games illustrated by her

General Audience
 D.C.P.S. (Da Capo Plus Situation) Infinity Never7 - the end of infinity 
 
 Super Real Mah-jong Hi Pai Paradise 2 

Eroge Content
 
 BACTA 2 
 FILE Ce'st·la·vie 
 
 Coming Heart 
 
 
 
 Sotsugyō Shashin 2''

List of light novels illustrated by her
  (written by ) (9 volumes)
  (written by Tōru Kai) (2 volumes)
  (written by ) (1 volumes)

References

External links
Yuna Kagesaki's homepage Garakuta Ichiba ("Bric-a-brac Market") 

Manga artists
Women manga artists
Japanese female comics artists
Japanese bloggers
Japanese women bloggers
1973 births
Living people